Putnam City West High School is a public 9–12 grade school in Oklahoma City, Oklahoma. It is part of the Putnam City Public Schools District. The school serves portions of suburban Oklahoma City as well as Bethany and Warr Acres. The school's sports teams are known as the Patriots and they are notable for having been state champions in football in 1981 and runners up in 1976 and 1977. In 2014, the school's basketball program was runner up for the Oklahoma 6A basketball title, losing to Tulsa Union High School in the final. In 2016, Putnam City West's boys' basketball team beat Norman North for the 6A state title.

Notable alumni
Scott Tinsley, former USC Trojans and NFL quarterback
Rickey Brady, former Oklahoma Sooners and NFL tight end
Bryan White, country music artist
Austin Winkler, lead singer, Hinder

References 

Educational institutions in the United States with year of establishment missing
Public high schools in Oklahoma
Schools in Oklahoma City